Penguin's Blizzard River, is a spinning rapids ride at Six Flags America themed to the Penguin. Debuting in April 2003, the attraction is the tallest spinning rapids ride in the world.

See also
WhiteWater West Industries

References

Six Flags America
Warner Bros. Global Brands and Experiences attractions
Gotham City (theme parks)